This list of birds of Great Britain comprises all bird species that have been recorded in a wild state in Great Britain. It follows the official British List, maintained by the British Ornithologists' Union (BOU). Decisions relating to the British List are published by the British Ornithologists' Union Records Committee (BOURC) in its annual reports in the BOU's journal Ibis. These reports were formerly geographically based and included the whole of the British Isles, but records for the Republic of Ireland and Northern Ireland are now published by their own ornithological associations. Records from the Isle of Man are adjudicated by the Manx Ornithological Society.

Bird species admitted to the British List are those in BOU categories A, B or C:
A: species that have been recorded in an apparently natural state at least once since 1 January 1950.
B: species that were recorded in an apparently natural state at least once between 1 January 1800 and 31 December 1949, but have not been recorded subsequently.
C: species that, although originally introduced by humans, either deliberately or accidentally, have established breeding populations derived from introduced stock, which maintain themselves without necessary recourse to further introduction.
Birds can be listed in more than one category: for example the Canada goose has a large introduced population but there have also been a few naturally occurring vagrants, so it meets the criteria for both categories A and C.

Categories D and E (not listed here) are used for record keeping only, and species in these categories are not included in the British List:
D: species that would otherwise appear in categories A or B except that there is reasonable doubt that they have ever occurred in a natural state.
E: species that have been recorded as introductions, transportees, or escapees from captivity, and whose breeding populations (if any) are not believed to be self-sustaining.
A further category (not listed here) is being compiled:

 F: species recorded before 1800, including fossil species.

As of 3 December 2022, there are 628 species of birds on the British List, the latest addition being the white-chinned petrel. Four species groups (birds that were not identified to species level) are included in an appendix – southern/northern giant petrel (Macronectes giganteus/halli), Fea's/Desertas petrel (Pterodroma feae/desertas), Black-bellied/White-bellied Storm Petrel (Fregetta tropica/grallaria), and Brown/South Polar skua (Stercorarius antarctica/maccormickii). Six further species are awaiting consideration by the British Ornithologists' Union Records Committee.

Species listed on this page as "rare" are those for which a full description is required for acceptance of the record by the British Birds Rarities Committee. Other species have an indication of their breeding and wintering status in Great Britain.

In general the avifauna of Britain is similar to that of the rest of Europe. Because of its mild winters, Great Britain has a considerable population of wintering species, particularly ducks, geese and swans. There are also a number of species, such as the oystercatcher, that are resident on the island of Great Britain, but migrants elsewhere. Britain receives a number of vagrants from Asia and North America. Some American gulls, ducks and waders are regular enough not to be considered rare, including the ring-billed gull, surf scoter and pectoral sandpiper. There is one endemic bird species found in Great Britain: the Scottish crossbill.

Ducks, geese, and swans
Order: AnseriformesFamily: Anatidae

The swans, ducks and geese are medium to large birds that are adapted to an aquatic existence with webbed feet and bills which are flattened to a greater or lesser extent. In many ducks the male is colourful while the female is dull brown. The diet consists of a variety of animals and plants. The family is well represented in Britain, especially in winter when large numbers visit from Greenland, Scandinavia and Russia.

Pheasants, grouse, and allies
Order: GalliformesFamily: Phasianidae

These are terrestrial species, feeding and nesting on the ground. They are variable in size but generally plump, with broad and relatively short wings. Four of these were introduced for hunting or ornamental purposes but one has now apparently died out.

Nightjars and allies
Order: CaprimulgiformesFamily: Caprimulgidae

Nightjars are medium-sized nocturnal birds that usually nest on the ground. They have long wings, short legs and very short bills. Their soft plumage is cryptically coloured to resemble bark or leaves.

Swifts
Order: ApodiformesFamily: Apodidae
The swifts are small birds which spend the majority of their lives flying. These birds have very short legs and never settle voluntarily on the ground, perching instead only on vertical surfaces.

Bustards
Order: OtidiformesFamily: Otididae

Large, sturdy birds of open plains with long legs and necks and strong feet. They are all rarities.

Cuckoos
Order: CuculiformesFamily: Cuculidae

Birds of variable size with slender bodies and long tails. Some species are known for laying their eggs in the nests of other birds.

Sandgrouse
Order: PterocliformesFamily: Pteroclidae

Sturdy, medium-sized birds with a small head and long, pointed wings.

Pigeons and doves
Order: ColumbiformesFamily: Columbidae

Pigeons and doves are stout-bodied birds with short necks and short slender bills with a fleshy cere. There are 344 species worldwide, seven in Britain.

Rails, gallinules, and coots
Order: GruiformesFamily: Rallidae

These birds mainly occupy dense vegetation in damp environments near lakes, marshes or rivers. Many are shy and secretive birds, making them difficult to observe. Most species have strong legs and long toes which are well adapted to soft uneven surfaces.

Cranes
Order: GruiformesFamily: Gruidae

Cranes are large, long-legged and long-necked birds. Unlike the similar-looking but unrelated herons, cranes fly with necks outstretched, not pulled back. Most have elaborate and noisy courting displays or "dances".

Grebes
Order: PodicipediformesFamily: Podicipedidae

Grebes are small to medium-large diving birds with lobed toes and pointed bills. They are seen mainly on lowland waters and coasts. They feed on aquatic animals and nest on a floating platform of vegetation.

Stone-curlews
Order: CharadriiformesFamily: Burhinidae

A small family of medium to large waders with strong black bills, large yellow eyes and cryptic plumage.

Oystercatchers
Order: CharadriiformesFamily: Haematopodidae

The oystercatchers are large, obvious and noisy wading birds with strong bills used for smashing or prising open molluscs. There are eleven species worldwide with one in Britain.

Stilts and avocets
Order: CharadriiformesFamily: Recurvirostridae

A family of fairly large wading birds. The avocets have long legs and long up-curved bills. The stilts have extremely long legs and long, thin, straight bills. There are ten species worldwide with two in Britain.

Plovers and lapwings
Order: CharadriiformesFamily: Charadriidae

Small to medium-sized wading birds with compact bodies, short, thick necks and long, usually pointed, wings.

Sandpipers and allies
Order: CharadriiformesFamily: Scolopacidae

A large, diverse family of wading birds. Different lengths of legs and bills enable multiple species to feed in the same habitat, particularly on the coast, without direct competition for food.

Pratincoles and coursers
Order: CharadriiformesFamily: Glareolidae

A family of slender, long-winged wading birds.

Gulls, terns, and skimmers
Order: CharadriiformesFamily: Laridae

Medium to large seabirds with grey, white and black plumage, webbed feet and strong bills. Many are opportunistic and adaptable feeders.

Skuas
Order: CharadriiformesFamily: Stercorariidae

Medium to large seabirds with mainly grey or brown plumage, sharp claws and a hooked tip to the bill. They chase other seabirds to force them to drop their catches.

Auks, murres, and puffins
Order: CharadriiformesFamily: Alcidae

A family of seabirds which are superficially similar to penguins, with their black-and-white colours, upright posture and some of their habits, but which are able to fly.

Tropicbirds
Order: PhaethontiformesFamily: Phaethontidae

Tropicbirds are slender white birds of tropical oceans, with exceptionally long central tail feathers. Their heads and long wings have black markings.

Divers
Order: GaviiformesFamily: Gaviidae

Divers are aquatic birds the size of a large duck, to which they are unrelated. They swim well and fly adequately but are almost helpless on land, because their legs are placed towards the rear of the body. They feed on fish and other aquatic animals.

Southern storm petrels
Order: ProcellariiformesFamily: Oceanitidae

The southern storm petrels are the smallest seabirds, feeding on plankton and small fish picked from the surface, typically while hovering. They nest in colonies on the ground, most often in burrows.

Albatrosses
Order: ProcellariiformesFamily: Diomedeidae

The albatrosses are among the largest flying birds, with long, narrow wings for gliding. The majority are found in the Southern Hemisphere with only vagrants occurring in the North Atlantic.

Northern storm petrels
Order: ProcellariiformesFamily: Hydrobatidae

The northern storm-petrels are the smallest seabirds, feeding on plankton and small fish picked from the surface, typically while hovering. They nest in colonies on the ground, most often in burrows.

Shearwaters and petrels
Order: ProcellariiformesFamily: Procellariidae

These are highly pelagic birds with long, narrow wings and tube-shaped nostrils. They feed at sea on fish, squid and other marine life. They come to land to breed in colonies, nesting in burrows or on cliffs.

Storks
Order: CiconiiformesFamily: Ciconiidae

Storks are large, heavy, long-legged, long-necked wading birds with long stout bills and wide wingspans. They fly with the neck extended.

Frigatebirds
Order: SuliformesFamily: Fregatidae

Frigatebirds are large seabirds usually found over tropical oceans. They are large, black-and-white, or completely black, with long wings and deeply forked tails. The males have colored inflatable throat pouches. They do not swim or walk and cannot take off from a flat surface. Having the largest wingspan-to-body-weight ratio of any bird, they are essentially aerial, able to stay aloft for more than a week.

Boobies and gannets
Order: SuliformesFamily: Sulidae

Gannets are large seabirds that plunge-dive for fish and nest in large colonies. They have a torpedo-shaped body, long, narrow, pointed wings and a fairly long tail. There are ten species worldwide with three in Britain.

Cormorants and shag
Order: SuliformesFamily: Phalacrocoracidae

Cormorants are medium to large aquatic birds with mainly dark plumage and areas of coloured skin on the face. The bill is long, thin and sharply hooked for catching fish and aquatic invertebrates. They nest in colonies by water, usually by the sea or on the banks of rivers.

Ibises and spoonbills
Order: PelecaniformesFamily: Threskiornithidae

A family of long-legged, long-necked wading birds. Ibises have long, curved bills. Spoonbils have a flattened bill, wider at the tip.

Bitterns, herons and egrets
Order: PelecaniformesFamily: Ardeidae

Herons and egrets are medium to large wading birds with long necks and legs. Bitterns tend to be shorter-necked and more secretive. They all fly with their necks retracted. The sharp bill is used to catch fish, amphibians and other animals. Many species nest in colonies, often in trees. There are 64 species worldwide and 15 in Britain.

Pelicans
Order: PelecaniformesFamily: Pelecanidae

Pelicans are large water birds with a distinctive pouch under their beak. As with other members of the order Pelecaniformes, they have webbed feet with four toes.

Osprey
Order: AccipitriformesFamily: Pandionidae

A large fish-eating bird of prey belonging to a family of its own. It is mainly brown above and white below with long, angled wings.

Hawks, eagles, and kites
Order: AccipitriformesFamily: Accipitridae

A family of birds of prey which includes hawks, buzzards, eagles, kites and harriers. These birds have very large powerful hooked beaks for tearing flesh from their prey, strong legs, powerful talons and keen eyesight.

Barn owls
Order: StrigiformesFamily: Tytonidae

Barn owls are medium to large owls with large heads and characteristic heart-shaped faces. They have long strong legs with powerful talons.

Owls
Order: StrigiformesFamily: Strigidae

Typical owls are small to large solitary nocturnal birds of prey. They have large forward-facing eyes and ears, a hawk-like beak and a conspicuous circle of feathers around each eye called a facial disc.

Hoopoe
Order: BucerotiformesFamily: Upupidae

A small family with a long curved bills, crests and black-and-white striped wings and tails.

Rollers
Order: CoraciiformesFamily: Coraciidae

A small family of colourful, medium-sized birds with a crow-like shape that feed mainly on insects.

Kingfishers
Order: CoraciiformesFamily: Alcedinidae

Kingfishers are medium-sized birds with large heads, long pointed bills, short legs and stubby tails.

Bee-eaters
Order: CoraciiformesFamily: Meropidae

A group of near-passerine birds characterised by richly coloured plumage, slender bodies and usually elongated central tail-feathers.

Woodpeckers
Order: PiciformesFamily: Picidae

Woodpeckers are small to medium-sized birds with chisel-like beaks, short legs, stiff tails and long tongues used for capturing insects. Many woodpeckers have the habit of tapping noisily on tree trunks with their beaks.

Falcons and caracaras
Order: FalconiformesFamily: Falconidae

A family of small to medium-sized, diurnal birds of prey with pointed wings. They do not build their own nests and mainly catch prey in the air.

Parrots
Order: PsittaciformesFamily: Psittaculidae

Parrots are small to large birds with a characteristic curved beak shape. They are found mainly in areas with warm climates.

Tyrant flycatchers
Order: PasseriformesFamily: Tyrannidae

A large family from the Americas.

Shrikes
Order: PasseriformesFamily: Laniidae

Shrikes are passerine birds known for their habit of catching other birds and small animals and impaling the uneaten portions of their bodies on thorns. A typical shrike's beak is hooked, like a bird of prey.

Vireos
Order: PasseriformesFamily: Vireonidae

The vireos are a group of small to medium-sized passerine birds restricted to the New World.

Old World orioles
Order: PasseriformesFamily: Oriolidae

The orioles are medium-sized passerines, mostly with bright and showy plumage, the females often have duller plumage than the males The beak is long, slightly curved and hooked. Orioles are arboreal and tend to feed in the canopy. There are 36 species worldwide, one of which has been recorded in Great Britain.

Crows, jays, and magpies
Order: PasseriformesFamily: Corvidae

The crows and their relatives are fairly large birds with strong bills and are usually intelligent and adaptable.

Waxwings
Order: PasseriformesFamily: Bombycillidae

The waxwings are a group of passerine birds characterised by soft, silky plumage and unique red tips to some of the wing feathers.

Tits, chickadees, and titmice
Order: PasseriformesFamily: Paridae

Tits are mainly small, stocky, woodland species with short stout bills. They are adaptable birds, with a mixed diet including seeds and insects.

Penduline tits
Order: PasseriformesFamily: Remizidae

Small birds with finely pointed bills that build purse-like nests hanging from a branch.

Bearded tit
Order: PasseriformesFamily: Panuridae

A single species formerly placed in the Sylviidae family.

Larks
Order: PasseriformesFamily: Alaudidae

Larks are small terrestrial birds with often extravagant songs and display flights. Most larks are fairly dull in appearance. Their food is insects and seeds.

Swallows
Order: PasseriformesFamily: Hirundinidae

The family Hirundinidae is adapted to aerial feeding. They have a slender streamlined body, long pointed wings and a short bill with a wide gape.

Bush warblers
Order: PasseriformesFamily: Cettiidae

A recently split family formerly placed in the Sylviidae family. There are 32 species worldwide, with one found in Britain.

Long-tailed tits
Order: PasseriformesFamily: Aegithalidae

Small, long-tailed birds that typically live in flocks for much of the year. There are 13 species worldwide with one in Britain.

Leaf warblers
Order: PasseriformesFamily: Phylloscopidae

A recently split family of small insectivorous birds, formerly included within the Sylviidae. There are 81 species, with 16 in Britain.

Reed warblers
Order: PasseriformesFamily: Acrocephalidae

A small, insectivorous and vocal group of species, formerly included within the family Sylviidae.

Grassbirds and allies
Order: PasseriformesFamily: Locustellidae

A recently split family, previously part of the family Sylviidae.

Cisticolas and allies
Order: PasseriformesFamily: Cisticolidae

A group of insectivorous species, previously included within the family Sylviidae.

Sylviid warblers, parrotbills, and allies
Order: PasseriformesFamily: Sylviidae

A group of small insectivorous birds.

Kinglets
Order: PasseriformesFamily: Regulidae

A family of very small birds.

Wrens
Order: PasseriformesFamily: Troglodytidae

Wrens are small and inconspicuous birds, except for their loud songs. They have short wings and thin down-turned bills.

Nuthatches
Order: PasseriformesFamily: Sittidae

Nuthatches are small woodland birds with the unusual ability to climb down trees head-first, unlike other birds which can only go upwards.

Wallcreeper
Order: PasseriformesFamily: Tichodromadidae

One species, in its own family, a rare visitor to Britain.

Treecreepers
Order: PasseriformesFamily: Certhiidae

Treecreepers are small woodland birds, brown above and white below. They have thin, pointed, down-curved bills, which they use to extricate insects from bark.

Mockingbirds and thrashers
Order: PasseriformesFamily: Mimidae

Medium-sized passerine birds with long tails. Some are notable for their ability to mimic sounds such as other birds' songs.

Starlings
Order: PasseriformesFamily: Sturnidae

Starlings are small to medium-sized passerine birds with strong feet. Their flight is strong and direct and most are very gregarious.

Thrushes and allies
Order: PasseriformesFamily: Turdidae

The thrushes are plump, soft-plumaged, small to medium-sized insectivores or sometimes omnivores, often feeding on the ground. Many have attractive songs.

Old World flycatchers
Order: PasseriformesFamily: Muscicapidae. Subfamily: Muscicapinae

The flycatchers and chats are small, mainly insectivorous birds. The flycatchers fly out from a perch to catch insects in the air.

Dippers
Order: PasseriformesFamily: Cinclidae

Dark, dumpy, aquatic birds which are able to forage for food on the beds of rivers.

Old World sparrows
Order: PasseriformesFamily: Passeridae

Sparrows tend to be small, plump, brownish or greyish birds with short tails and short, powerful beaks. They are seed-eaters and they also consume small insects.

Accentors
Order: PasseriformesFamily: Prunellidae

A small family of drab, unobtrusive, insectivorous birds with thin, pointed bills.

Wagtails and pipits
Order: PasseriformesFamily: Motacillidae

Motacillidae is a family of small passerine birds with medium to long tails. They are slender, ground-feeding insectivores of open country.

Finches, euphonias, and allies
Order: PasseriformesFamily: Fringillidae

Seed-eating passerine birds that are small to moderately large and have a strong beak, usually conical and in some species very large.

Longspurs and arctic buntings
Order: PasseriformesFamily: Calcariidae

A small family of migratory seed eating birds.

Old World buntings
Order: PasseriformesFamily: Emberizidae.
A large group of seed-eating passerine birds with a distinctively shaped bill.

New World sparrows
Order: PasseriformesFamily: Passerellidae.

A seed eating group of species, recently split from the family Emberizidae.

Troupials and allies
Order: PasseriformesFamily: Icteridae.

The icterids are a group of small to medium-sized, often colorful passerine birds restricted to the New World and include the grackles, New World blackbirds, and New World orioles. Most species have black as a predominant plumage color, often enlivened by yellow, orange, or red.

New World warblers
Order: PasseriformesFamily: Parulidae

A group of small, often colourful passerine birds restricted to the New World. Most are arboreal and insectivorous.

Cardinals and allies
Order: PasseriformesFamily: Cardinalidae

The cardinals are a family of robust, seed-eating birds with strong bills. They are typically associated with open woodland. The sexes usually have distinct plumages.

The links above lead to family accounts and individual species. Taxonomy is very fluid in the age of DNA analysis, so other arrangements may be found, as in Sibley-Ahlquist taxonomy.

Species awaiting acceptance
The following species have been recorded recently and the British Ornithologists' Union Records Committee has not yet made a decision on whether to accept them onto the British List.

See also
 List of non-native birds of Great Britain
 List of birds of Leicestershire and Rutland
 List of birds of Wales
 Lists of birds by region
 British Birds Rarities Committee
 British Birds (a long-established ornithology journal).
 European birds

Footnotes

References
List of British birds published by The British Ornithologists' Union.
Taxonomic Recommendations for European Birds
Taxonomic recommendations for British birds (both in PDF format).
The Royal Society for the Protection of Birds (RSPB) and RSPB A to Z of UK Birds
Splitting headaches? Recent taxonomic changes affecting the British and Western Palaearctic lists – Martin Collinson, British Birds vol 99 (June 2006), 306–323
British Trust for Ornithology surveys

Bird
'01
'birds
Great Britain
bird